The Battle of Wusong (Woosung) was fought between British and Chinese forces at the entrance of the Wusong River (present-day Huangpu River), Jiangsu province, China, on June 16th, 1842 during the First Opium War. The British capture of the towns of Woosung (now Wusong) and Baoshan opened the way to Shanghai, which was captured with little resistance on June 19th.

Background 
From Wusong, the British would only have to advance 19 km to capture Shanghai. By doing so, it is hoped that they can cut off tax revenues to Peking and force the Chinese government to capitulate. But the campaign needed to be swift and successful before disease takes its toll on British forces, which could also increase domestic opposition in Britain against the war.

Battle 
On June 13th, HMS Cornwallis and the British fleet anchored off Wusong. Bombardment of the port began on June 16th, with Cornwallis and the other warships closed inshore while the transports, laden with troops, stood 4 miles offshore.

Counter fire from 3-mile lines of Chinese fortifications on the north bank of the river caused some casualties, but within two hours British gunfire suppressed the Chinese artillery. The warships’ boats were then lowered and started to land the Royal Marines and selected detachments of seamen who eventually seized the fortifications, spiked the guns and held their positions until the main land force could be brought up from the transports offshore.

Though a majority of the garrison had fled halfway in the battle, Chen continue to fight on until he was eventually killed. Afterwards, Liu Guobiao, Chen's commandant and close associate, carried Chen's corpse on his back away from the fray and hid it in a clump of reedy grass to prevent it from being discovered by the British.

Aftermath 
By the evening, with Wusong under control, British troops began advancing up the towards Shanghai. Soldiers and landed sailors marched along the left banks of the Wusong River, while others moved in steamers towing small boats. The only opposition was from a shore battery, halfway up the river towards Shanghai, which was eventually silenced by Royal Navy gunfire.

By 18 June, after silencing another shore battery just downriver from Shanghai, the strong force reached the city and occupied it the next day.

Gallery

Notes

References 
Battersby, W. (2010). James fitzjames: The mystery man of the Franklin expedition. Toronto, ON, Canada: Dundurn Group.
Bulletins of State Intelligence. Westminster: F. Watts. 1842.
Hall, William Hutcheon; Bernard, William Dallas (1846). The Nemesis in China (3rd ed.). London: Henry Colburn.
Rait, Robert S. (1903). The Life and Campaigns of Hugh, First Viscount Gough, Field-Marshal. Volume 1. Westminster: Archibald Constable.
Wataru, M. (2000). Japan and China: Mutual representations in the modern era (J. A. Fogel, Ed.). London, England: RoutledgeCurzon.

1842 in China
Battles of the First Opium War
Conflicts in 1842
Naval battles of the Opium Wars
June 1842 events
Military history of Shanghai
Woosung